The Women's 800m event at the 2010 South American Games was held on March 21 at 18:05.

Medalists

Records

Results
Results were published.

†:  Not eligible for the South American Under-23 Championships.

Intermediate times:

See also
2010 South American Under-23 Championships in Athletics

References

External links
Report

800 W